Swimming at the 2018 Summer Youth Olympics was held from 7 to 12 October at the Natatorium in Buenos Aires, Argentina.

Schedule
The schedule was released by the Buenos Aires Youth Olympic Games Organizing Committee.  In the table below, M stands for morning (begins 10:00), and E stands for evening (begins 18:00).

All times are local (UTC–3).

Medal summary

Medal table

Events

Boys' events

Girls' events

Mixed events

 Swimmers who participated in the heats only and received medals.

Participating nations

  (1)
  (3)
  (2)
  (6)
  (1)
  (1)
  (8)
  (3)
  (1)
  (2)
  (2)
  (4)
  (1)
  (2)
  (3)
  (2)
  (8)
  (1)
  (2)
  (4)
  (2)
  (1)
  (8)
  (1)
  (1)
  (4)
  (8)
  (4)
  (4)
  (1)
  (1)
  (1)
  (2)
  (4)
  (2)
  (4)
  (1)
  (1)
  (4)
  (2)
  (4)
  (1)
  (4)
  (8)
  (1)
  (1)
  (8)
  (1)
  (4)
  (1)
  (1)
  (2)
  (1)
  (4)
  (8)
  (3)
  (2)
  (4)
  (1)
  (3)
  (4)
  (5)
  (1)
  (8)
  (2)
  (4)
  (1)
  (1)
  (2)
  (1)
  (4)
  (1)
  (2)
  (4)
  (2)
  (1)
  (2)
  (2)
  (2)
  (1)
  (1)
  (2)
  (4)
  (4)
  (2)
  (2)
  (3)
  (4)
  (1)
  (4)
  (2)
  (2)
  (2)
  (1)
  (1)
  (1)
  (3)
  (1)
  (8)
  (4)
  (1)
  (1)
  (4)
  (8)
  (1)
  (1)
  (2)
  (1)
  (2)
  (4)
  (2)
  (1)
  (4)
  (4)
  (4)
  (8)
  (4)
  (8)
  (1)
  (1)
  (1)
  (1)
  (5)
  (4)
  (1)
  (2)
  (3)
  (1)
  (1)
  (2)
  (4)
  (4)
  (8)
  (1)
  (4)
  (3)
  (3)
  (2)
  (1)
  (1)

References

External links
Official Results Book – Swimming

 
2018 Summer Youth Olympics events
Youth Summer Olympics
Swimming competitions in Argentina
2018